John Dunn was an Australian rules footballer for the Port Adelaide Football Club.

References

Port Adelaide Football Club players (all competitions)